Pestovo is a rural locality (a village) in Novoselskoye Rural Settlement, Kovrovsky District, Vladimir Oblast, Russia. The population was 38 as of 2010.

Geography 
Pestovo is located 63 km southwest of Kovrov (the district's administrative centre) by road. Anokhino is the nearest rural locality.

References 

Rural localities in Kovrovsky District